Kainovo znamení is a 1928 Czechoslovak romantic drama film directed by Oldrich Kmínek.

Cast
Václav Norman ...  Ing. Jan Rybecký 
Josef Šváb-Malostranský ...  Innkeeper 
Antonie Nedošinská ...  Innkeeper's Wife 
Anita Janová ...  Lidunka 
Egon Thorn ...  B. Frank 
Bronislava Livia ...  Irena 
Josef Rovenský ...  Tucek 
Mary Jansová ...  Marie 
František Marík ...  Policeman

External links 
 

1928 films
Czechoslovak black-and-white films
Czech silent films
Czechoslovak romantic drama films
1928 romantic drama films
Silent romantic drama films